Sergio Castelletti (30 December 1937 – 28 November 2004) was an Italian professional footballer and manager, who played as a defender.

Career

Player

As a football, he played several seasons with Fiorentina, winning twice Coppa Italia (1961, 1966), a UEFA Cup Winners' Cup (1961) and a Mitropa Cup (1966).

Along with his team-mate Enzo Robotti, who also came from the province of Alessandria like Castelletti himself, he formed a strong full-back pairing, which sometimes even lined up with the Italy national football team.

Manager

After the end of his footballer career, Castelletti trained Fiorentina youth team, some clubs in Serie B and in lower divisions.

Death

He died in 2004.

References

1937 births
2004 deaths
Sportspeople from the Province of Alessandria
Italian footballers
Italy international footballers
Serie A players
Serie B players
Serie C players
Italian football managers
Casale F.B.C. players
Torino F.C. players
ACF Fiorentina players
S.S. Lazio players
Ternana Calcio players
Empoli F.C. managers
S.S.D. Lucchese 1905 managers
U.S. Alessandria Calcio 1912 managers
Association football defenders
Vigevano Calcio players
Footballers from Piedmont